Sir Tasman Hudson Eastwood "Tas" Heyes  (6 November 189625 June 1980) was a senior Australian public servant and policymaker. He was Secretary of the Department of Immigration between May 1946 and November 1961.

Life and career
Tasman Heyes joined the Commonwealth Public Service in 1912 as a messenger in the Department of Defence.

In 1941, he was Acting Director of the Australian War Memorial, and oversaw the opening of the institution.

Between 1946 and 1961, Heyes was Secretary of the Department of Immigration. He defended the White Australia policy, preferring British and Northern European immigrants, and people of 'Aryan' stock.

Heyes died on 25 June 1980 and was cremated.

Awards
Heyes was made a Commander of the Order of the British Empire in June 1953. He was appointed a Knight Bachelor in January 1960 for service as Secretary of the Department of Immigration.

In 1962, Heyes was awarded the Nansen Refugee Award by the UN Refugee Agency, for his work as head of the Department of Immigration.

References

1980 deaths
1896 births
Australian Commanders of the Order of the British Empire
Secretaries of the Australian Government Immigration Department
Nansen Refugee Award laureates